The Maple Leaf Stakes is a Thoroughbred horse race run annually at Woodbine Racetrack in Toronto, Ontario, Canada. Run during the first part of November, the Grade III Maple Leaf is open to fillies aged three or older. Raced over a distance of one and one-quarter miles on Polytrack synthetic dirt, it currently offers a purse of $150,000.

Inaugurated in 1892, the Maple Leaf Stakes has been competed at a variety of distances. Since 1956, when the new Woodbine Racetrack hosted the event, the race distance have been set as follows:
  miles : 1956-1958 at Woodbine Racetrack, 1959 and 1965 at Greenwood Raceway
 1 mile : 1960-1964 at Greenwood Raceway
   miles : 1966-1993 at Greenwood Raceway and since 1994 at Woodbine Racetrack

Records
Speed  record:  (at current distance of  miles)
 2:02.18 - Pachattack (2010)

Most wins:
 2 - Tattling (1926, 1927)
 2 - Shady Well (1932, 1933)
 2 - Passa Grille (1941, 1942)
 2 - Floral Gift (1945, 1946)
 2 - Teddy's Sister (1951, 1952)
 2 - Golden Turkey (1961, 1962)
 2 - Hinemoa (1966, 1967)
 2 - Not To Shy (1969, 1970)
 2 - Lovely Sunrise (1974, 1975)
 2 - Bye Bye Paris (1976, 1977)
 2 - Sintrillium (1983, 1984)
 2 - Wings of Erin (1995, 1996)
 2 - One For Rose (2003, 2004)

Most wins by an owner:
 7 - Conn Smythe (1959, 1969, 1970, 1974, 1975, 1976, 1977)
 6 - William Hendrie (1891, 1894, 1896, 1899, 1900, 1902)

Most wins by a jockey:
 5 - Brian Swatuk (1969, 1975, 1982, 1983, 1984)

Most wins by a trainer:
 6 - Donnie Walker (1969, 1970, 1974, 1975, 1976, 1977)

 Pat Remillard won the Maple Leaf Stakes four times as a jockey (1934,1936, 1942, 1949) and then again as a trainer in 1973.

Winners of the Maple Leaf Stakes since 1959

 In 1973 Sharp Quill finished first but was disqualified and set back to second.
 In 1994, Plenty Of Sugar finished first but was disqualified and set back to third.

Earlier winners

1958 - Windy Answer
1957 - Turn Me Loose
1956 - Air Page
1955 - Festivity
1954 - June Brook
1953 - Winter Lady
1952 - Teddy's Sister
1951 - Teddy's Sister
1950 - Filsis
1949 - Tab Wales
1948 - Ascendant
1947 - Yellowknife
1946 - Floral Gift
1945 - Floral Gift
1944 - Sister Pat
1943 - Patruska
1942 - Passa Grille
1941 - Passa Grille
1940 - Koracan
1939 - Budsis
1938 - Mona Bell
1937 - Fore Isus
1936 - Ladymuch
1935 - Chickpen
1934 - Candy Feast
1933 -  Shady Well
1932 -  Shady Well
1931 - Step Off
1930 - Lindsay
1929 - Dance Circle
1928 - Best Bonnett
1927 - Tattling
1926 - Tattling
1925 - Tricky Take Off
1924 - Vrana
1923 - Prismar
1922 - Affectation
1921 - Sudor
1920 - Ostara
1915 - Lady Curzon
1914 - Dark Rosaleen
1913 - Sarolta
1912 - Amberite
1911 - Bride Lane
1910 - Frolic
1909 - Mendip
1908 - Cannie Maid
1907 - Sea Wall
1906 - Fair Havana
1905 - Maid of Barrie
1904 - Loupanga
1903 - Prodigality
1902 - Lyddite
1901 - Lady Berkley
1900 - Barley Sugar
1899 - Toddle Ladle
1898 - Violent
1897 - Downright
1896 - Melcha
1895 - Waterflow
1894 - Nancy Lee
1893 - Bonnie Bluff
1892 - Queen Mary

See also
 List of Canadian flat horse races

References
 The Maple Leaf Stakes at Pedigree Query
 The 2007 Maple Leaf stakes at the NTRA

Ungraded stakes races in Canada
Middle distance horse races for fillies and mares
Recurring events established in 1892
Woodbine Racetrack
1892 establishments in Canada